The 1920 Minnesota Golden Gophers football team represented the University of Minnesota in the 1920 college football season. In their 21st year under head coach Henry L. Williams, the Golden Gophers compiled a 1–6 record (0–6 against Big Ten Conference opponents) and were outscored by their opponents by a combined score of 92 to 62. The team suffered the program's first ever six-game losing streak, and it finished tied for last place in the conference.

Guard Festus Tierney and halfback Arnold Oss were selected as first-team player on the 1920 All-Big Ten Conference football team.

Schedule

References

Minnesota
Minnesota Golden Gophers football seasons
Minnesota Golden Gophers football